Al Wilson (born 1977) is a former American football player.

Al Wilson may also refer to:

 Al Wilson (pilot) (1895–1932), American film actor, producer and stunt pilot
 Al Wilson (singer) (1939–2008), American soul singer
 Al Wilson (offensive lineman) (born 1950), Canadian football player
 Al Wilson (wrestling), father of former World Wrestling Entertainment diva Torrie Wilson

See also
 Alan Wilson (disambiguation)
 Albert Wilson (disambiguation)
 Alexander Wilson (disambiguation)
 Alfred Wilson (disambiguation)